Carlos Ariel Peralta Mendoza, known by his stage name Maffio (born 1986), is a Dominican urban music producer, composer and artist.

Biography 

Mendoza was born in 1986 in Santo Domingo, Dominican Republic.

His musical endeavors began at the age of six when he began teaching himself to play the piano. At age 9, he started composing songs and at 12, he started producing. At age 20, he achieved his first worldwide success: "My soul dies".
The name "Maffio" comes from his father, who nicknamed him that after noticing that even as a child, Carlos had a fondness for mafia documentaries.
His musical influences include Bob Marley, Donna Summer, Bee Gees, Camilo Sesto, Michael Jackson and Chuck Mangione.
His recording and producing studio is called "ReHab" and has been operating in Miami for five years. In 2015, Mayor Tomás Pedro Regalado honored Maffio with the keys to the city of Miami.
He was an independent artist until 2019; he is currently signed to Sony Music Entertainment.

Current projects 
Currently finalizing his debut album TumbaGobierno, the album was scheduled to be released in fall 2020. He has collaborated with artists such as Farruko, Nacho, Nicky Jam, Bryant Myers, Chino & Nacho, Fonseca, Gente de Zona, Juan Magán, Fuego, Akon, Soleil, Olga Tañón and Elvis Crespo. His song "Tú Me Quemas" appears in the movie Ride Along 2.
He also produced Akon's album El Negreeto, with Anitta, Ozuna, Anuel AA, Nacho, Farruko and Becky G.
Maffio is involved in charity work at St. Jude Children's Research Hospital and formerly at Miami Children's Hospital.

Discography

As a main artist 
 Si Yo Fuera Él (feat. Joey Montana) (2012)
 No Te Dejaré De Amar (2012)
 No Tengo Dinero (2013)
 Quiero Otro Amor (2014)
 Cristina (feat. Nacho, J Quiles y Shelow Shaq) (2019)
 Celebration (Feat Farruko, Akon & Kymani Marley) (2019)
 Mente A Na (feat Nacho Kiko El Crazy TITO EL BAMBINO & Quimico Ultramega) (2020)
 Carne (Maffio feat Don Miguelo) (2020)
 Solo (Omar Montes Ana Mena Maffio) (2021)
 Dale pa'ya (with Big Time Rush) (2022)
 Me gusta Me gusta (with Paulina Rubio) (2022)

Producer 
2009 Producer "Súper Estrella" de Fuego y Omega.
2010 Producer "Que buena tu ta", Fuego feat. Divani.
2011 Producer "Eres mi sueño", Fonseca.
2012 Producer "Ropa Puesta" Gente De Zona
2013 Artist invitado "Tentandome" Juan Magan
2015 Producer "Tú me quemas", Chino y Nacho 
2015 Producer "Mambo Para Bailar", Fuego
2015 Producer "Chillax", Farruko.
2015 Productor "Bajito" JenCarlos Canela
2016 Productor "Pa Que Me Invitan" Jencarlos Canela
2016 Producer "Baby" Jencarlos Canela
2016 Writer "Si No Te Quisiera", Juan Magán feat. Belinda y Lápiz Conciente.
2016 Writer "Vuelve", Juan Magán feat. Paulina Rubio.
2018 Producer "Ponle Música" de Bryant Myers feat. Plan B.
2018 Producer "Bad Like Me" Kalash feat Admiral T.
2018 Producer "I Will Be There" Kalash
2017 Producer y compositor "Without You", Nicky Jam.
2019 Producer "Me Botó", Lo Blanquito
2019 Producer "No Voy A Llorar" Natti Natasha
2019 Producer y compositor "Cristina", Maffio, Nacho, J Quiles feat. Shelow Shaq
2019 Producer " Te Quiero Amar" Akon feat Pitbull
2019 Producer " Bailame Lento" Akon
2019 Producer "Como No" Akon feat Becky G
2019 Producer "Boom Boom" Akon feat Anitta
2019 Producer "Dile" Akon
2019 Producer "Innocente" Akon
2019 Producer "Mambo A Los Haters" Nacho feat Fuego
2019 Producer "Solo Tu" Akon feat Farruko
2019 producer y featuring "la range" felon
2019 Producer "Baila Conmigo" Akon
2019 Producer "Cristina" Maffio feat J Quiles, Nacho & Shelow Shaq
2020 Producer/Performer "Mente A Na" feat TITO EL BAMBINO Kiko el Crazy Nacho & Quimico UltraMega
2020 Producer/Performer "Me Siento Bien" Darkiel feat Shaggy & Maffio
2020 Producer/Performer "Carne" Maffio feat Don Miguelo
2020 Producer "Pam" Jquiles X Daddy Yankee X El Alfa

Video clips 
 2019: Cristina
2019: Celebration
2020: Mente A Na
2020: Uchi Wala

Acknowledgments 
 Double Platinum, Jencarlos Canela, "Bajito", Central America as writer
 Double Platinum, Gente de Zona, "Visualízate", United States as producer
 11× Diamond, Nicky Jam, "Fénix", United States
 Platinum, Jencarlos Canela, "Baby", Central America
 Diamond, Jencarlos Canela, "Bajito", Central America
 Gold, Juan Magán feat. Belinda and Lápiz Conciente, "Si No Te Quisiera", United States
 Double Platinum, Juan Magán feat. Maffio, "Tentándome", Spain
 Triple Platinum, Juan Magán feat. Paulina Rubio, "Vuelve", Spain
 6× Platinum, Farruko, "Chillax", United States as producer
 No. 1 Billboard, Chino & Nacho, "Tú me quemas", United States as writer
 Gold, Kalash, "Kaos", France,
 Winner of 20 ASCAP Awards

References 

1986 births
People from Santo Domingo
Dominican Republic musicians
Sony Music Latin artists
Living people
Latin music record producers
Latin music songwriters